Lenox School was a private preparatory school for boys in grades nine through twelve in Lenox, Massachusetts. The school was affiliated with the Episcopal Church (United States).

School history
The school opened in 1926 under the leadership of Rev. G. Gardner Monks, the school's first headmaster.  His son Robert A. G. Monks was born while he and his wife were serving the school. In 1946 the Rev. Robert L. Curry, D.D. became the second and longest serving headmaster, leaving in 1969.  Over the years Lenox's enrollment ranged from 150 to 250 boys with about 32 teachers or masters. The school was modeled on the English public school system and instead of grades to designate classes, the term 'forms' was used. Third Form referred to the freshman year through the Sixth Form for the senior year.  The school used a system of 'prefects' who were members of the Sixth Form and were elected by the senior class or appointed by the headmaster.  

It was primarily a residential boarding school, with some day students commuting from the surrounding region of the central Berkshire Hills. The church influence was felt through a number of Episcopal clergy faculty members, required sacred studies classes and a daily chapel service at Trinity Episcopal Church. In addition to strong academic standards, the school was notable for its sports teams. The motto of the school was Non Ministrari-Sed Ministrare; "not to be ministered unto but to minister" or more commonly translated as "not to be served but to serve".

Eventually, financial problems led to the school's closure.  A 1972 merger with the Bordentown Military Institute was an uncomfortable alliance between two disparate school cultures. By the following school year, the combined entity was closed, as the Vietnam War had reduced the popularity of a military education. The fate of the school was not unique among private secondary schools in the central Berkshires.  By the mid-1970s neighboring Foxhollow School, Windsor Mountain School, Cranwell Preparatory School (Jesuit) and Stockbridge School had all closed. Like Lenox School, these were small boarding schools serving students from throughout the northeast and sometimes beyond, occupying campuses that were once grand estates, often referred to as 'Berkshire Cottages' by their seasonal Gilded Age occupants.

The core of the school's campus is now the site of Shakespeare & Company.  In spite of nearly five decades passing since the closure of Lenox School for Boys, student loyalty is reflected in an active alumni organization that produces a quarterly newsletter and convenes an annual Fall reunion in Lenox.

Notable alumni
Robert C. Seamans, Jr., Deputy Administrator of NASA during the Kennedy and Johnson administrations; Secretary of the Air Force under Richard Nixon
William Anthony Paddon, (1931) Canadian physician, author and seventh Lieutenant Governor of Newfoundland and Labrador
Francis G. James, Sr. (1932), professor of Irish history at Tulane University for nearly 40 years
Rt. Rev. William Benjamin Spofford, Jr., (1938), Bishop of the Episcopal Diocese of Eastern Oregon (1969-1979), Assistant Bishop of the Episcopal Diocese of Washington (1979-1984, 1990), b. 1921, d. 2013
Stanley Loomis, (1940), author of four books on French history
John Allen Gable, (1961), executive director of the Theodore Roosevelt Association until his death
Kirk Scharfenberg, (1961), distinguished journalist with the New York Times and the Boston Globe, 1984 Pulitzer Prize winner.
Robert L. Crosby, (1961), Swift Boat captain in Vietnam, where he died, was a friend of presidential candidate John Kerry
Clifton O. Dummett, (1961), professor of dentistry at LSU, helped integrate the New Orleans Yacht club, known for lectures on pediatric dentistry, deceased.
 Richard Wilhelm, (1964), hotel executive with The Waldorf Astoria, St. Regis and The Plaza Hotels in NYC, President/CEO of  Interbank-Brener, Island Outpost Hotels, Trust Hotels & Resorts, EVP & GM Fairfiled Communities
 Nathaniel Benjamin, (1965), master wooden boat builder  
Lucien A. Hold, (1965), comedy-club talent booker & manager, helped discover & promote the early careers of New York comedians Chris Rock, Jerry Seinfeld and Adam Sandler. Married to Vanessa Hollingshead. Deceased 2004.
William Homans (Watermelon Slim), blues musician
 William Earnshaw, Ph.D., (1968), Professor of Chromosome Dynamics at the University of Edinburgh, Institute of Cell Biology
 Oliver (Nol) Putnam (1951) (Faculty 1960-1971), Blacksmith, forged the doors for the National Cathedral in Washington, DC and other notable works.

References

External links
Lenox School Alumni Association
Lucien Hold Memorial My Space page
School & alumni information with related links
A History of Lenox School and Its Campus

Defunct schools in Massachusetts
Educational institutions established in 1926
1970s disestablishments in Massachusetts
Boys' schools in the United States
Schools in Berkshire County, Massachusetts
1926 establishments in Massachusetts